Apterichtus flavicaudus, variously known as the orange snake eel, sharpnose sand eel or sharpnose snake eel, is a species of snake eel native to the Indian Ocean from the Seychelles to Hawaii in the Pacific Ocean. It can be found at depths of from  being particularly common in shallow coastal waters with sandy substrates in near vicinity to reefs.  This species can reach a length of  TL.

References

flavicaudus
Fish described in 1904
Fish of the Indian Ocean
Taxa named by John Otterbein Snyder